Sunda bulbul has been split into two species:
 Javan bulbul, Ixos virescens
 Sumatran bulbul, Ixos sumatranus

Birds by common name